Freedom Fighters: The Ray is an American animated web series developed by Greg Berlanti and Marc Guggenheim. It premiered on December 8, 2017, on The CW's online streaming platform, CW Seed and is based on DC Comics character Ray Terrill / The Ray (portrayed by Russell Tovey), a housing rights advocate who gains light-based powers after being exposed to a genetic light bomb. The series is part of the Arrowverse franchise and is primarily set on the dystopian Earth-X, while also partly taking place on Earth-1, the parallel fictional universe of Arrow, The Flash, Vixen and Legends of Tomorrow.

Premise
Raymond "Ray" Terrill is a housing rights advocate who discovers a doppelganger of himself from another Earth. The man disappears, and gives him light-based powers, and he is recruited to join the Freedom Fighters on Earth where he battles the New Reichsmen.

Cast and characters

Main
 Russell Tovey as Ray Terrill / The Ray: A public interest advocate who gains light-based powers from his Earth-X counterpart and becomes a member of the Freedom Fighters on Earth-X.
 Tovey also voices his Earth-X counterpart, a member of the Freedom Fighters, who died fighting Overgirl, giving his powers to Ray.
 Jason Mitchell as John Trujillo: A co-worker of Terrill's that helps him learn about his newfound powers.
 Mitchell also voices his Earth-X counterpart, Black Condor, who is member of the Freedom Fighters
 Dilshad Vadsaria as Jenny Knight: A co-worker of Terrill's.
 Vadsaria also voices her Earth-X counterpart, Phantom Lady, who is a member of the Freedom Fighters.

Recurring
 Melissa Benoist as Overgirl: An alternate supervillain version of Earth-38 Supergirl who is a member of the New Reichsmen on Earth-X. Benoist reprises her role from "Crisis on Earth-X".
 Iddo Goldberg as Red Tornado of Earth-X: A member of the Freedom Fighters.
 Matthew Mercer as Black Arrow: A member of the New Reichsmen that resembles Green Arrow, but is not the same as Dark Arrow. He is called Dark Arrow in "Crisis on Earth-X".
 Mercer also voices his Earth-1 counterpart Oliver Queen / Green Arrow, replacing Stephen Amell.
 Scott Whyte as Blitzkrieg: An alternate version of the Earth-1 Flash who is a member of the New Reichsmen on Earth-X.
 Whyte also voices his Earth-1 counterpart, Barry Allen / Flash, replacing Grant Gustin.
 Carlos Valdes as Cisco Ramon / Vibe of Earth-X: A member of the Freedom Fighters.
 Valdes also voices his Earth-1 counterpart, reprising his role from The Flash
 Sunil Malhotra as Jacob: Ray's original lover.

Guest
 Matthew Mercer as Dollman
 Colleen O'Shaughnessey as Grace Terrill: Ray's mother.
 Bruce Thomas as Robert Terrill: Ray's father.
 Danielle Panabaker as Caitlin Snow: A bioengineering expert from S.T.A.R. Labs. Panabaker reprises her role from The Flash.
 Christopher Corey Smith as Donald: A politician.
 Megalyn Echikunwoke as Mari McCabe / Vixen. Echikunwoke reprises her role from Vixen 
 Echo Kellum as Curtis Holt / Mister Terrific. Kellum reprises his role from Arrow

Episodes

Season 1 (2017)

Season 2 (2018)

Production
The series was first announced in August 2016 by The CW with a 2017 debut and to air on CW Seed, from executive producers Greg Berlanti and Marc Guggenheim and developed by Blue Ribbon Content. It was also announced that the lead character would be gay, and the network was looking for an actor to voice the character with the possibility of appearing in live-action later on. The series was inspired by Grant Morrison's Multiversity comic book series. Guggenheim noted there was "a very specific reason" the series was titled as it was, in order to introduce the Freedom Fighters and Earth-X. He continued, "Morrison came up with an idea we really responded to: The Freedom Fighters are made up of various minorities targeted by Nazis—women, gay men, Jews. We wanted to honor that idea. At the same time, it's an origin story about the Earth-1 iteration of The Ray." Earth-X is a world in the multiverse where the Nazis won World War II and the New Reichsmen rule over present day America. In September 2017, it was revealed that Russell Tovey would be voicing Ray Terrill in the series.

Freedom Fighters: The Ray is also set prior to the events of the 2017 live-action Arrowverse crossover, "Crisis on Earth-X". Guggenheim added that the animated series featured some "continuity mix-ups... [and] inconsistencies", as "Crisis on Earth-X" was conceived after Freedom Fighters was already written and Guggenheim "didn't see eye-to-eye" with fellow crossover executive producer Andrew Kreisberg on how tightly the animated series should tie-in with "Crisis on Earth-X"; Guggenheim hoped to address these with a comic book. On the series being a prequel to the crossover, Guggenheim revealed that it was not intended to be such, and was originally intended to be released before the crossover. However, once the decision was made to feature The Ray in live-action, it necessitated the casting of the correct actor, which lead to Tovey. Guggenheim explained: At that point, "we could either just continue to go forward as we already were with the animated series with a different voice and a slightly different look to the character of the Ray, or we could take the extra time to have Russell voice the character, do some design alterations, make the Ray's appearance in the animated series line up more with the way Russell actually looks. There was just no way to turn those kind of changes around and release it before the crossover. It was just more important to have Russell's voice in the series than it was to get it out early".

Release

Freedom Fighters: The Ray premiered on CW Seed on December 8, 2017, releasing the first six episodes of the series. The next six episodes, marketed as the second season, was released on July 18, 2018, after debuting at the 2018 San Diego Comic-Con.

Home media
In June 2018, it was announced that the first two seasons would be made available as one feature-length presentation on Blu-ray and DVD, which was released on August 28, 2018.

Reception
Oliver Sava of The A.V. Club gave the first three episodes a "B" rating. He felt "the story has an interesting structure, beginning with two episodes showing the dire situation on Earth-X before making a sudden jump across dimensions for the third episode," but noted that it makes "The Ray feel like a supporting character in his own show". Sava praised the conflicts in Ray's personal life "that are largely unexplored in the superhero genre, especially in film and television," with the show showing "how they can quickly add tension and depth to fantastic narratives". Regarding Tovey's performance, Sava said, "Tovey does strong work capturing Ray's anxiety and fear about coming out, and you can hear his disappointment in himself as he tries and fails to embrace his sexuality."

Luke Y. Thompson of Forbes gave a favorable review of the Blu-Ray release. He stated that it was "the most emotionally stirring of all the DC animated movies [he'd] seen and reviewed." Thompson praised the animation saying it was "better than usual too, with more cel-shading on CG to give vistas real depth."

Arrowverse

Tovey appeared as The Ray in "Crisis on Earth-X", the 2017 Arrowverse crossover event between Supergirl, Arrow, The Flash and Legends of Tomorrow. Additional concepts and characters from Freedom Fighters were featured in the crossover.

In November 2019, DC announced that they would be producing two tie-in comic books, to accompany the "Crisis on Infinite Earths" crossover event. These would include a storyline running concurrently to the on-screen episodes, focusing on the characters of The Ray, Felicity Smoak, Nyssa Al Ghul and Wally West. The first comic book was released in December 2019, with the second released in January 2020.

References

External links
 
 

 
2010s American adult animated television series
2010s American science fiction television series
2017 American television series debuts
2018 American television series endings
Adult animated television shows based on DC Comics
American adult animated web series
American adult animated action television series
American adult animated adventure television series
American adult animated science fiction television series
American adult animated superhero television series
English-language television shows
2010s American LGBT-related animated television series
Television series about Nazis
Television series by Warner Bros. Animation
Television shows set in Tulsa, Oklahoma
Television shows set in New York City
Television series by Blue Ribbon Content
Television series about World War II alternate histories